In enzymology, a cob(II)yrinic acid a,c-diamide reductase is an enzyme that catalyzes the chemical reaction

2 cob(I)yrinic acid a,c-diamide + FMN + 3 H+  2 cob(II)yrinic acid a,c-diamide + FMNH2

The three substrates of this enzyme are cob(I)yrinic acid a,c-diamide, flavin mononucleotide, and H+; its two products are cob(II)yrinic acid a,c-diamide and FMNH2.

Classification 

This enzyme belongs to the family of oxidoreductases, specifically those oxidizing metal ion with a flavin as acceptor.

Nomenclature 

The systematic name of this enzyme class is cob(I)yrinic acid-a,c-diamide:FMN oxidoreductase. This enzyme is also called CobR and cob(II)yrinic acid-a,c-diamide:FMN oxidoreductase (incorrect).

Biological role 

This enzyme is part of the biosynthetic pathway to cobalamin (vitamin B12) in bacteria.

See also
 Cobalamin biosynthesis

References

 
 

EC 1.16.8
Enzymes of unknown structure